Strattonia is a genus of fungi within the Strattoniaceae family.

The genus was circumscribed by Raffaele Ciferri in Sydowia vol.8 on page 245 in 1954.

The genus name of Strattonia is in honour of Robert Stratton (1883–1961), who was an American botanist and Mycologist, Professor of Botany and Plant pathology at the Oklahoma Agricultural and Mechanical College and at the Agricultural Experiment Station in Stillwater.

Species
As accepted by Species Fungorum;
 Strattonia borealis 
 Strattonia dissimilis 
 Strattonia grandis 
 Strattonia insignis 
 Strattonia mesopotamica 
 Strattonia oblecythiformis 
 Strattonia petrogale 
 Strattonia tetraspora 
 Strattonia zopfii 

Former species;
 Strattonia carbonaria  = Jugulospora carbonaria, Neoschizotheciaceae
 Strattonia karachiensis  = Lundqvistomyces karachiensis, Schizotheciaceae
 Strattonia minor  = Jugulospora minor, Neoschizotheciaceae

References

External links
Strattonia at Index Fungorum

Lasiosphaeriaceae